Braddock (or Bradock) was launched in 1815 at Workington or Maryport. She spent most of her career sailing to the United States and the West Indies. In 1828 she made a voyage to Calcutta under a license from the British East India Company (EIC). Her crew abandoned her in a sinking state on 30 January 1829 as she was returning to England from Bengal.

Career
Bradock first appeared in Lloyd's Register (LR) in 1816 with Jackson, master, Bradock, owner, and trade Liverpool–Savannah.

On 21 November 1816, Braddock, Johnson, master, was on shore at the Nole, near Savannah. Braddock was on a voyage from Liverpool to Savannah.

In 1813 the EIC had lost its monopoly on the trade between India and Britain. British ships were then free to sail to India or the Indian Ocean under a license from the EIC.

Fate
On 22 September 1828, Braddock sailed from Calcutta for Liverpool. Bradock was in a sinking state with six feet of water in her hold. Chatham took off the crew. LR (1829) has the annotation "abandoned" to her entry.

Citations and references
Citations

References

1815 ships
Age of Sail merchant ships of England
Maritime incidents in January 1829